Radoslav Rochallyi (born 1 May 1980), Bardejov , Czechoslovakia is a Slovak philosopher, writer and poet living in the Czech Republic.

Biography 
Rochallyi was born in Bardejov, located in the Prešov region of what is today the Slovak Republic in a family with Lemko and Hungarian roots.
 The author finished his studies in Philosophy at the Faculty of Arts of the University of Prešov (1999–2005) and completed postgraduate PhD studies

He is a member of Mensa and member of Association of Slovak Writers. He is a Czech-based artist.

Work 
Rochallyi is the author of fifteen books. He writes in Slovak, Czech, English and German. He debuted with the collection of poetry Panoptikum: Haikai no renga (2004), written in Japanese haiku.

According to Jan Balaz, the poetry of Radoslav Rochally is characterized by the use of a free verse, which gives the author the necessary freedom and directness to retain the specific nature of the testimony without embellishments.

His book Mythra Invictus has received a positive reception.

According to Lenka Vrebl, the perception of Radoslav Rochallyi is not playful, it is serious, direct and focused.

In the field of philosophy of poetry, he was influenced by the work of physicist Max Tegmark and mathematician G. H. Hardy. In the field of creation, he was shaped by the works of early experimental avant-garde artists (painters and poets). In the French magazine Recours au poème n ° 212, Rochally's philosophy of creation is described as mathematical determinism.

In the DNA-Canvases of Poetry collection he uses mathematical equations to express his poetry.
In addition to his book, poetic equations have also been published in many anthologies and journals. For example in anthologies and journals published at Stanford University, California State University, Utah Tech University, Olivet College, or Las Positas College.

In the Punch collection, he uses poems based on mathematics, especially on mathematical equations. Both the texts and the equations are based on the author’s need to divide the text into a semantically and formally clear form. This work does not belong to concrete, pattern, graphic, code, FIB, or visual poetry. It is an alternative approach to creation.
Poetic equations from the Punch collection was reviewed and published in journals.

By Andrea Schmidt Rochallyi be able to find a bearable relationship between the mathematical formalism and freedom. Schmidt argues that his poetry is a critique of semantics and language as such. Schmidt, in a review in the Rain Taxi, writes that PUNCH can be considered one of the most important works of experimental poetry in the last decade.

Steven J Fowler in an annotation to the book # Mathaeata wrote that Rochallyi builds poetry in mathematical terms, situating a droll humour laced with Nietzchean declaration within the context of brilliantly innovative visual design.

His work includes mainly philosophy, visual arts,  and poetry, while linking each of these elements with mathematical symbols. Rochallyi uses mathematical language as an organizational principle and at the same time uses mathematical symbols to describe intonation notation, or to define various types of specifications whose semantics are easier or more effective to express in non-verbal form.

Golden Ratio Poetry 

Rochallyi used an experimental poetic form of the golden ratio around 2012.
It follows a strict structure based on the golden number 1.618033 in syllables. Typically represented in the form of six lines, 1/6/1/8 / (0) / 3/3 - with so many words or syllables on the line that correspond to the golden number. The only limitation of poetry according to the golden number is the number of words or syllables followed by the sequence number 1.618033. The Greek letter Phi represents the golden ratio. Its value is 1.618034. In Golden Divine collection (2015), he tried to link poetry with Fi (φ) and hence the number 1,618034 in non-graphical form and with a golden section in its graphic form.
Schmidt argues that his Golden Divine is a prototype of formal fundamentalism in poetry, employing a restriction according to the Greek letter phi.
The only limitation of "Golden Ratio Poetry" is that the number of words or syllables follows the sequence of digits in 1.618034.

Equation Poetry 

Equation Poetry uses mathematical language as an organizational principle and at the same time uses mathematical symbols to describe intonation notation (for example, nervous³), or to define various types of specifications that are simpler or more efficient to express in non-text form. In Acta Victoriana Rochallyi claims that every formal rule in poetry is a mathematical rule.
This restriction defines the form of poetry. Hence, it can be said that (almost) no form of poetry can do without mathematics. In the Author’s Note in Roanoke Review he mentioned that they both have symbolism, algorithmic basis, structures, formulas, and symmetry. Combining the two is completely natural, as is reading and studying their patterns.

Rochallyi claim that the ambition of Equation Poetry should not be to preserve the meaning of the equation, but to preserve the form, formula and symmetry as accurately as possible. Preserving its full meaning would define the content of poetry and not just form. In such a case, we would not even be making poetry because the resulting poem would be a cluster of precisely positioned words, but without the general meaning. And we wouldn't be creating anything mathematical either; the resulting equation would simply not make sense.

According to Rochallyi's article in The Minnesota Review, Equation Poetry is characterized by a greater freedom of writing, or at least the possibility of choosing the equations used, which in itself defines the freedom of its creation. And this is a freedom much greater than that provided by most of the strict structural forms.

Works

Poetry 
2004 – Panoptikum: Haikai no renga. [in Slovak]. .
2014 – Yehidah. [in Slovak] 2014. 67 p. .
2015 – Golden Divine. [in Slovak] Brno: Tribun EU, 34 p. .
2015 – Blood. [in Slovak]2015. 43 p. .
2016 – Torwalden. [in Slovak] 2016. .
2018 – Mechanics of everyday life. [in Slovak] 2018. .
2018 – Arété.[in Slovak] 2018.  
2019 – DNA: Leinwänden der Poesie [in German] 
2019 – DNA: Canvases of Poetry [in English]  
2020 – PUNCH [in English]  
2021 – # mathaeata [in English],  
2022 – Rovnicová poézia/ Equation Poetry. [in Slovak] Bratislava: Drewo a srd, 96 p.

Prose 
2017 – A Letter for a son.Brno: Tribun EU, 2017. 98 p. [in English] .
2019 – Mythra Invictus. The destiny of man. Bratislava: VSSS, 2019. 108 p. [in English] [in German] .
2020 – ESSE. Theorems on morality and power. Bratislava: EOCN. 168p. [in English] .

Translations 
2016 – Golden Divine. [in English]. 2016. 34 s. .

See also

Visual poetry
Mathematics and art
Conceptual art
Concrete poetry

References

External links

 Archives of deleted personal page, url: https://web.archive.org/web/20230118235041/https://rochallyi.blogspot.com/ and https://web.archive.org/web/20230208130428/https://rochallyi.blogspot.com/p/anthologies-journals.html
 Rochallyi profile at The ARCHIVE OF DIGITAL ART (ADA, the former Database of Virtual Art), Universität für Weiterbildung Krems, url: https://www.digitalartarchive.at/database/artists/general/artist/rochallyi.html
 Radoslav Rochallyi (de) Kulturvernetzung Niederösterreich GmbH. 2019. url: https://www.kulturvernetzung.at/de/rochallyi/
 "Poets & Writers Directory › Radoslav Rochallyi". Poets & Writers. USA: Poets & Writers, Inc. Retrieved 26 November 2020, url: https://www.pw.org/directory/writers/radoslav_rochallyi

People from Bardejov
Academic staff of the University of Prešov
Slovak poets
Slovak philosophers
University of Prešov alumni
1980 births
Living people
Slovak writers
20th-century Slovak writers
Conceptual artists
Postmodernists
Mensans
20th-century male writers
Male novelists
Mathematical artists
Slovak essayists
Visual poets